We All Die Alone is a 2021 American dark comedy short film directed by Jonathan Hammond and written by Hammond and Ryan Roach. It stars Brian Patrick Butler, Frank DiPalermo, Joshua Alan Jones and Patrick Mayuyu. The film premiered in 2021 at the FilmOut San Diego LGBT Film Festival in San Diego, California. It has screened at festivals such as Sidewalk Film Festival, Sarasota Film Festival, San Diego International Film Festival, HollyShorts Film Festival and won awards at Burbank International Film Festival, Phoenix Film Festival, GI Film Festival, Oceanside International Film Festival and Idyllwild International Festival of Cinema. The film was distributed by Omeleto on their YouTube channel.

Plot 
The arrogance of a conflict negotiator results in two clashing gangs butting heads in a stand-off that leads to dramatic conversations about Mexican food, romance and tragic consequences.

Cast 

 Brian Patrick Butler as Riley
 Frank DiPalermo as Peter
 Joshua Alan Jones as Killer
 Patrick Mayuyu as Phillip
 Durwood Murray as Second Story
 Carla Nell as Patsy
 Suzana Norberg as Svetlana
 Brent Roberts as Crusher
 Alexandra Slade as Evangelique

Production 
Jonathan Hammond and Ryan Binse are a few San Diego filmmakers involved in the project. The film was originally made as a 48 hour film and was recreated after three years with additional characters. Ryan Roach co-wrote the script.

Release 
We All Die Alone premiered on September 12, 2021 at the FilmOut San Diego LGBT Film Festival in San Diego, California. It screened on October 15 of the same year at San Diego International Film Festival. In 2022, it screened at Sidewalk Film Festival, Dances With Films, HollyShorts Film Festival, Sarasota Film Festival, GI Film Festival San Diego and Reeling: The Chicago LGBTQ+ International Film Festival.

The film was distributed on YouTube by Omeleto on November 22, 2022.

Reception

Critical response
Alan Ng of Film Threat said the film is "exactly what I look for in comedy" and "bends the gangster genre enough to make the story feel fresh."

Accolades

References

External links 

 
 
 We All Die Alone on YouTube

2020s American films
2020s crime comedy films
2020s English-language films
2021 romantic comedy-drama films
2021 short films
2021 black comedy films
American black comedy films
American comedy short films
American films about revenge
American gang films
American gangster films
American romantic comedy-drama films
Films about criminals
Films about food and drink
Films about organized crime in the United States
Films about the American Mafia
Films released on YouTube
Films set in San Diego
Films shot in San Diego
Gay-related films
Girls with guns films
LGBT-related black comedy films
LGBT-related romantic comedy-drama films
American LGBT-related short films
Mafia comedy films
Murder–suicide in films
Romantic crime films
Tragicomedy films
Films about feuds